"Shine On" is the first single Ryan Cabrera released from his 2005 studio album You Stand Watching. The song is a discussion of Cabrera's former relationship with Ashlee Simpson. In the song, Cabrera tells Simpson that he was never good enough for her but he still loves her.

Charts

References

Ryan Cabrera songs
2005 singles
Songs written by Ryan Cabrera

Music videos directed by Kevin Kerslake
Songs written by Guy Erez
Songs written by Andrew Ripp